Andrey Vyacheslavovich Zakharov (Russian: Андрей Вячеславович Захаров; born in Saint Petersburg) is a Russian investigative journalist, special correspondent of BBC News Russian, and four-time winner of the Redkollegia journalism award.

Biography
Zakharov graduated from the Saint Petersburg State University in 2005 with a degree in history of arts.

While working at Fontanka, Zakharov published an investigation into Evgeny Prigozhin's troll factory.

In 2016, Zakharov moved to Moscow. In 2016–2018, he worked as a special correspondent for the RBK magazine, where he published an investigation on the Russian interference in the 2016 United States elections.

In 2018–2022, Zakharov was a special correspondent for BBC News Russian.

Moreover, while working at Proekt in 2020–2021, Zakharov authored an article, revealing Vladimir Putin's alleged affair with Svetlana Krivonogikh.

In October 2021, the Ministry of Justice of the Russian Federation included Zakharov into the list of foreign agents. Shortly after, he left Russia and moved to the United Kingdom.

Awards
Zakharov is a two-time winner (in 2014 and 2015) of the  "Golden Pen" award.

He is also a four-time winner (twice in 2017, in 2020, and 2022) of the Redkollegiya award.

References

Journalists from Saint Petersburg
People listed in Russia as media foreign agents
Redkollegia award winners
BBC people
Living people
Year of birth missing (living people)